Kevin Bacon (born 1958) is an American film and theater actor and musician.

Kevin Bacon may also refer to:

Kevin Bacon (producer) (born 1959), English musical producer, also the bassist of the band Comsat Angels
Kevin Bacon (politician) (born 1971), state representative of the US state of Ohio
Kevin Bacon (equestrian) (1932–2020), Australian Olympic equestrian

See also